Michael Lucas' La Dolce Vita is a gay pornographic remake of the Federico Fellini classic film La Dolce Vita, directed by Michael Lucas and Tony Dimarco and released by Lucas Entertainment in 2006.

The film stars Michael Lucas, Jason Ridge, Chad Hunt, Cole Ryan, Pete Ross, Derrick Hanson, Ray Star, Brad Star, Jack Bond, Wilson Vasquez, Jonathan Vargas, Ben Andrews, and more. It features non-sexual cameos by Savanna Samson, Kevin Aviance, Amanda Lepore, Heather Fink, Will Clark and Johnny Hanson.

Lucas contends that the film is the most expensive gay porn film ever made due to a budget of $250,000 and multiple celebrity cameos.

Cast
 Ben Andrews
 Rod Barry
 Jack Bond
 Jamie Donovan
 Erik Grant
 Derrick Hanson
 Michael Lucas
 Jack MacCarthy
 Spencer Quest
 Pete Ross
 Cole Ryan
 Brad Star
 Ray Star
 Jonathan Vargas
 Wilson Vasquez

Cameos (non-sexual)
 Savanna Samson
 Gus Mattox
 Amanda Lepore
 Michael Musto
 Kevin Aviance
 Johnny Hanson
 Will Clark
 Heather Fink

Awards
In 2007 at the GayVN's in San Francisco, it won all 14 awards it was nominated for, including best picture, best director (Michael Lucas & Tony DiMarco), best threesome (Michael Lucas, Derrick Hanson, and Jason Ridge), best actor (Michael Lucas) and best non-sexual performance (Savanna Samson).

 2007 GayVN Award: Best Picture
 2007 GayVN Award: Best Actor
 2007 GayVN Award: Best Threesome
 2007 GayVN Award: Best Director
 2007 GayVN Award: Best Supporting Actor
 2007 GayVN Award: Best Non-Sex Performance
 2007 GayVN Award: Best Screenplay
 2007 GayVN Award: Best Editing
 2007 GayVN Award: Best Music
 2007 GayVN Award: Best Art Direction
 2007 GayVN Award: Best Videography
 2007 GayVN Award: Best DVD Extras/Special Edition
 2007 GayVN Award: Best Packaging
 2007 GayVN Award: Best Marketing Campaign

Issues of trademark and copyright infringement
Lucas Entertainment, Inc., its distribution wing and Michael Lucas were named as defendants in a lawsuit filed by International Media Films, Inc. in February 2007. The suit alleges willful trademark and copyright infringement against the La Dolce Vita mark.  International Media Films owns the rights to Fellini's La Dolce Vita. The suit seeks unspecified damages and to stop sales of Michael Lucas' La Dolce Vita Parts 1 & 2. In May 2007, a Manhattan federal judge rejected the request to enjoin the sales of Lucas' film, primarily on the grounds of "inexcusable delay" on the plaintiff's part. The judge noted that there were serious issues raised regarding trademark infringement or tarnishment, but also wrote that it "seems extremely unlikely that a hapless purchaser seeking to buy Fellini’s film will inadvertently stumble across Michael Lucas’s La Dolce Vita”, which would be an important element in proving IMF's case.

Lucas won the lawsuit in April 2010 in a summary judgment by Judge John George Koeltl, who dismissed IMF's claims of copyright infringement.

References

Gay pornographic films
2000s pornographic films
2006 films
American remakes of Italian films
Films directed by Michael Lucas
2000s English-language films